Jharrel Jerome (born October 9, 1997) is an American actor and rapper who is best known for appearing in Barry Jenkins's acclaimed drama film Moonlight (2016), and for portraying Korey Wise in Ava DuVernay's Netflix miniseries When They See Us (2019). He won the Primetime Emmy Award for Outstanding Lead Actor in a Limited Series or Movie and the Critics' Choice Television Award for Best Actor in a Movie/Miniseries.

Early life and education 
Jerome was born and raised in the Bronx, New York. He is of Dominican descent and identifies as Afro-Latino. He grew up in a close-knit family with parents who he described as "loving". His mother suggested he pursue acting when he was in eighth grade, after which he joined the Riverdale Children's Theatre, a local youth theatre organization. He attended and graduated from Fiorello H. LaGuardia High School and commuted to Manhattan each day by train.

Career

Acting 
Shortly after Jerome enrolled as an undergraduate at Ithaca College, he was cast in his first professional acting role in the 2016 independent film Moonlight, as young Kevin. A.O. Scott wrote in The New York Times that he was "excellent" in the role. Director Barry Jenkins said about Jerome, in an interview with the Los Angeles Times, "When you watch Jharrel in that movie, he's not a guy who's been over-rehearsing. That's a dude learning by doing. It's amazing."

Since 2017, Jerome has appeared in the Audience series Mr. Mercedes. He auditioned for the role of young Korey Wise in the 2019 Netflix miniseries When They See Us, based on the Central Park jogger case. After his audition the series' director, Ava DuVernay, asked him to read the lines for adult Korey Wise, and he was subsequently cast in both roles. Jerome grew close to Wise throughout filming, and said in a Los Angeles Times interview, "He's my brother now. I look up to him. I look up to his courage. He's taught me so much on how to be strong."

Music 
Jharrel released "For Real" ft. Kemba on September 23, 2020. The song was produced by songwriting duo Take a Daytrip and marked Jharrel's first single as a hip hop artist. Upon release, Jharrel posted a message on his social media accounts that included: "Before my life changed, I had no idea I’d want to turn rap from a hobby to a career. But given my acting platform and these unbelievable blessings through the past few years, I decided to hone in on my music. Since 2016, I’ve been putting all the bank I’ve made from my films into studio sessions and recording equipment; trying to find my sound, my voice, my cadence, and my style. 4 years, 600 sessions and 80 songs later, I think I’ve found it."

Filmography

Film

Television

Accolades 
Jerome and his Moonlight co-star, Ashton Sanders, won the 2017 MTV Movie & TV Award for Best Kiss.

Jerome won the 2019 Outstanding Lead Actor in a Limited Series or Movie category for his role in When They See Us. He is the first Afro-Latino actor to win an Emmy for acting and the youngest winner in the category. He also won in 2020 at the 10th Critics' Choice Television Awards for Best Actor in a Movie/Miniseries for When They See Us.

Jerome was placed on BET's "Future 40" list, which is a list of "40 of the most inspiring and innovative vanguards who are redefining what it means to be unapologetically young, gifted & black". Time listed Jerome on their first annual TIME 100 Next list, which is a list of 100 rising stars.

References

External links
Official Instagram

Living people
21st-century American male actors
Male actors from New York City
American people of Dominican Republic descent
Fiorello H. LaGuardia High School alumni
Entertainers from the Bronx
1997 births
Primetime Emmy Award winners